Juan Alcántara (6 March 1920 – 7 July 2002) was a Chilean footballer. He played in five matches for the Chile national football team in 1945 and 1946. He was also part of Chile's squad for the 1945 South American Championship. and part of Chile's squad for the 1946 South American Championship.

References

External links
 

1920 births
2002 deaths
Chilean footballers
Chile international footballers
Place of birth missing
Association football midfielders
Audax Italiano footballers